Alliance Police nationale is a French police union established May 9, 1995, in Aubervilliers, Seine-Saint-Denis. 
Alliance Police nationale is the result of merging two unions:
 Syndicat indépendant de la Police nationale (SIPN), representing uniformed police (established in 1951)
 Syndicat national des enquêteurs (SNE), representing detectives (established in 1990)
A third union, the Syndicat des gradés de la Police nationale (SGPN), joined in 1997.

External links 
Alliance Police Nationale official website

Trade unions in France
Police unions
Organizations based in Île-de-France